The Belvédère du Rayon Vert is a former hotel in Cerbère, France, designed in the art deco style by the Perpignan architect, Léon Baille, and built between 1928 and 1932. It has the overall appearance of a ship. It had its own cinema and a tennis court on the roof. It closed in 1983.

In 1987, the building was protected under the list of historic monuments (inscription). Part of the building has been brought back into use as apartments, with some original features. The building is open to visitors most afternoons.

The hotel is located at the north entrance to the municipality of Cerbère, between the railway and the departmental road 914 to Perpignan.

References

External links
 

Hotel buildings completed in 1932
Art Deco hotels
Art Deco architecture in France
Architecture in France
Defunct hotels in France
Buildings and structures in Pyrénées-Orientales
Monuments historiques of Pyrénées-Orientales